Senator Byrne may refer to:

Bradley Byrne (born 1955), Alabama State Senate
Frank M. Byrne (1858–1927), South Dakota State Senate
Hugh Byrne (Fianna Fáil politician) (born 1943), Irish Fianna Fáil Senator
John F. Byrne Sr. (1911–1965), Pennsylvania State Senate
John F. Byrne Jr. (born 1935), Pennsylvania State Senate
Leslie Byrne (born 1946), Virginia State Senate
Maria Byrne (born 1967), Irish Fine Gael Senator
Paul L. Byrne (1910–1962), California State Senate
Robert Byrne (North Dakota politician) (1886–1967), North Dakota State Senate
William T. Byrne (1876–1952), New York State Senate

See also
Harry T. Burn (1895–1977), Tennessee State Senate
Senator Byrnes (disambiguation)